Dmitri Antoni (born August 18, 1983 in Velsk, Soviet Union) is an Estonian figure skater. He is the 2002 Estonian bronze medalist. He placed 35th at the 2003 World Junior Figure Skating Championships.

References

External links
 Tracings.net profile

Estonian male single skaters
1983 births
Living people